Arnold Wienholt (25 November 1877 – 10 September 1940) was an Australian grazier, author and politician. He was a Member of the Queensland Legislative Assembly and a Member of the Australian House of Representatives.

Early life
Arnold Wienholt was born on 25 November 1877 at Goomburra, Queensland, the son of Edward Wienholt (a Member of the Queensland Legislative Assembly) and his wife Ellen (née Williams). He was educated in England at Wixenford School and Eton College before returning to Australia as a grazier on the Darling Downs.

He served in the military 1899–1902 and 1914–1916, and was a published author.

Politics
In 1909, he was elected to the Legislative Assembly of Queensland as the member for Fassifern, where he remained until 1913. In 1919, he was elected to the Australian House of Representatives as the Nationalist member for Moreton; he was also endorsed by the Primary Producers Union, effectively the Queensland state Country Party. Although sympathetic to the Country Party, formed in 1920, he remained a Nationalist, although the Country Party often received his support. He retired in 1922. In 1930 he returned to the Queensland Legislative Assembly as the member for Fassifern, where he remained until 1935.

Later life
Wienholt rejoined the military in 1939, at the start of World War II. He was killed in action in Abyssinia on 10 September 1940 and is memorialised at the Khartoum Memorial.

Published works
 
  — available online

References

Further reading
 
 
  — available online

External links

Nationalist Party of Australia members of the Parliament of Australia
Members of the Australian House of Representatives for Moreton
Members of the Australian House of Representatives
Members of the Queensland Legislative Assembly
Australian military personnel killed in World War II
People educated at Eton College
People educated at Wixenford School
1877 births
1940 deaths
20th-century Australian politicians
Australian military personnel of the Second Boer War
Australian Army personnel of World War II
Australian people of Welsh descent